Haffey is a surname. Notable people with the surname include:

Chris Haffey (born 1985), American aggressive inline roller skater
Frank Haffey (born 1938), Scottish footballer
James Haffey (1857–1910), American politician

See also
Hafey